The University of Okara (UO) is a public university located in Renala Khurd, Okara, Punjab, Pakistan.

History
In 2005, Okara campus of the University of Education, Lahore (UE) was inaugurated by then Minister of Defence (Pakistan) Rao Sikandar Iqbal. On February 23, 2016, Provincial Assembly of the Punjab passed the "University of Okara Bill 2016". Following that, Government of the Punjab issued a notification on April 1, 2016, for the upgradation of Okara campus to the University of Okara.

See also
 University of Sahiwal
 University of Education
 Government College Women University, Sialkot
 Government College Women University, Faisalabad
 Government Sadiq College Women University, Bahawalpur
 Women University Multan

References

External links
UO official website

Public universities in Punjab, Pakistan
Educational institutions established in 2005
2005 establishments in Pakistan
Public universities and colleges in Punjab, Pakistan
Okara District